Centrally located within the Sochi Olympic Park sports venues, the Sochi Medals Plaza is located near the Fisht Olympic Stadium, the Black Sea coast and was the cauldron for the Olympic Flame. It is surrounded by a large water basin.

Every night, the medals of the 2014 Winter Olympics were awarded there. The stage will remain with legacy footsteps on it which will permanently record the names of all the medal winners. During the Olympics the venue temporarily could accommodate 20,000 standing spectators.

The plaza now shapes corners 2-5 of the Sochi Autodrom motor-racing circuit. The entire circuit snakes around other structures in the Sochi Olympic Park.

References

External links
Sochi2014 Profile

See also
 2010 Winter Olympics victory ceremonies - Vancouver Medals Plaza and Whistler Medals Plaza

Venues of the 2014 Winter Olympics
Adlersky City District
Buildings and structures in Sochi
Squares in Russia
Sport in Sochi